The Answer is a 1916 British silent drama film directed by Walter West and starring Muriel Martin-Harvey, George Foley and Dora Barton. It was based on a novel by Newman Flower.

Cast
 Muriel Martin-Harvey - The Lonely Woman 
 George Foley - Justin Siddeley 
 Dora Barton - The Lost Magdalene 
 George Bellamy - The Clerk 
 Joseph Tozer 
 Gregory Scott   
 Arthur M. Cullin

References

Bibliography
 Low, Rachael. The History of British Film, Volume III: 1914-1918. Routledge, 1997.

External links

1916 films
1916 drama films
British drama films
Films directed by Walter West
Films based on British novels
British silent feature films
British black-and-white films
1910s English-language films
1910s British films
Silent drama films